"Down in the Valley" is a song by Squeeze, released as a single on Glenn Tilbrook's independent Quixotic Records in 1998. It was written and recorded for Charlton Athletic, and was not included on the band's album from the same year, Domino.

For this single only, the official Squeeze line-up was simply the duo of Glenn Tilbrook and Chris Difford.

Track listing
 "Down in the Valley" (4:23)
 "Down in the Valley (crowd mix)" (3:47)
 "Down in the Valley (jug band version)" (3:08)
 "Down in the Valley (instrumental mix)" (4:26)

External links
Squeeze discography at Squeezenet

Squeeze (band) songs
1998 singles
Songs written by Glenn Tilbrook
Songs written by Chris Difford
1998 songs